WCKY may refer to:

 WCKY (AM), a radio station (1530 AM) licensed to Cincinnati, Ohio, United States
 WCKY-FM, a radio station (103.7 FM) licensed to Pemberville, Ohio, United States